A fruit tree is a tree which bears fruit that is consumed or used by animals and humans — all trees that are flowering plants produce fruit, which are the ripened ovaries of flowers containing one or more seeds. In horticultural usage, the term "fruit tree" is limited to those that provide fruit for human food. Types of fruits are described and defined elsewhere (see Fruit), but would include "fruit" in a culinary sense, as well as some nut-bearing trees, such as walnuts.

The scientific study and the cultivation of fruits is called pomology, which divides fruits into groups based on plant morphology and anatomy. Some of those groups are pome fruits, which include apples and pears, and stone fruits, which include peaches/nectarines, almonds, apricots, plums and cherries.

Emeritus professor of agriculture, Eliezer E. Goldschmidt, has researched the evolution of fruit tree productivity.

Examples of fruit trees
 Abiu
 Almond
 Amla (Indian gooseberry)
 Apple
 Apricot
 Avocado
 Bael
 Ber (Indian plum)
 Carambola (starfruit)
 Cashew
 Cherry
 Citrus (orange, lemon, lime, etc.)
 Coconut
 Crab apple
 Damson
 Durian
 Elderberry
 Fig
 Grapefruit
 Guava
 Jackfruit
 Jujube
 Lemon
 Lime
 Loquat
 Lychee
 Mango
 Medlar
 Morello cherry
 Mulberry
 Olive
 Orange
 Pawpaw, both the tropical Carica papaya and the North American Asimina triloba
 Peach and nectarine
 Pear
 Pecan
 Persimmon
 Plum
 Pomelo
 Quince
 Pomegranate
 Rambutan
 Sapodilla (chikoo)
 Soursop
 Sugar-apple (sharifa)
 Sweet chestnut
 Tamarillo
 Ugli fruit
 Walnut
 Water Apple

See also

 Fruit tree forms
 Fruit tree pollination
 Fruit tree propagation
 List of fruits
 Multipurpose tree
 Orchard
 Pruning fruit trees
 Drupe

References

External links
 Pennsylvania tree fruit production guide; a guide on how to set up an orchard in practice
 The fruit tree planting foundation
 Fruit tree pruning
 Index of apple cultivars

 
 
Trees
Fruit
Fruit production